There are many notable people associated with Lincolnshire. The following list is arranged chronologically by date of birth.

Born before 1701 
 Guthlac of Crowland (674-715), Christian saint
 Æthelhard (8th century-805), Archbishop of Canterbury 
 Hereward the Wake (c.1035-c.1072), Anglo-Saxon nobleman
 Lucy of Bolingbroke (1074-1136), countess of Chester
 Gilbert of Sempringham (c.1085-1190), Saint and Founder of the Gilbertine Order
 Aaron of Lincoln (c.1125-1186), financier
 Hugh of Lincoln (1135/40-1200), Bishop of Lincoln 
 Stephen Langton (c.1150-1228), Archbishop of Canterbury 
 Nicolaa de la Haye (c.1150-1230), landowner and administrator
 Robert Grosseteste (c.1175-1253), Bishop of Lincoln 
 Berechiah de Nicole (c.1210-c.1270), Tosafist
 Eleanor of Castile (1241-1290), wife of Edward I
 Little Saint Hugh of Lincoln (1246-1255), blood libel victim
 Katherine Swynford (c.1350-1403), third wife of John of Gaunt
 Henry IV of England (1367-1413), King of England
 Richard Foxe (1458-1528), bishop and founder of Corpus Christi College, Oxford
 John Taverner (c1490-1545), composer and organist
 John Whitgift (c.1503-1604), Archbishop of Canterbury
 John Foxe (c.1516-1587), author of Foxe's Book of Martyrs
 William Cecil, 1st Baron Burghley (1520-1598), Chief Advisor to Queen Elizabeth I 
 Anne Askew (1521-1546), Protestant martyr 
 William Byrd (1539-1623), composer
 John Smyth (c.1554-c.1612), founder of the Baptist denomination
 Robert Tighe (1562-1620), cleric and linguist
 Captain John Smith (1580-1631), leader of the settlement of Jamestown, Virginia
 John Cotton (1585-1652), clergyman
 Anne Bradstreet (1612-1672), poet
 John Leverett (1616-1678/79), penultimate governor of the Massachusetts Bay Colony
 Simon Patrick (1626-1707), English theologian and bishop
 Sir Isaac Newton (1642-1746), mathematician and physicist
 John Harrison (1693-1776), chronometer innovator 
 William Stukeley (1687-1765), antiquarian

Born 1701-1850 
 John (1703-1791) and Charles Wesley (1707-1788), founders of the Methodist movement
 Benjamin Huntsman (1704-1776), inventor of crucible steel
 Thomas Paine (1737-1809), political activist and philosopher
 Joseph Banks (1743-1820), botanist and naturalist
 Samuel Eyles Pierce (1746-1829), preacher and theologian
 Thomas Scott (1747-1821), Bible commentator and co-founder of the Church Missionary Society 
 George Bass (1771-c.1803), explorer of Australia 
 Matthew Flinders (1774-1814), navigator and cartographer
 Richard Watson (1781-1833), theologian and Methodist writer
 George Davenport (1783-1845), sailor and frontiersman
 Peter De Wint (1784-1849), landscape painter
 Pishey Thompson (1784-1862), publisher and antiquarian writer
 Sir John Franklin (1786-1847), Arctic explorer
 Andreas Kalvos (1792-1869), poet
 Christopher Wordsworth (1807-1885), Bishop of Lincoln
 Alfred Lord Tennyson (1809-1892), poet
 Herbert Ingram (1811-1860), journalist
 Lady Charlotte Guest (1812-1895), businesswoman and Welsh language translator 
 George Boole (1815-1864), mathematician
 William Marwood (1818-1883), hangman
 Jean Ingelow (1820-1897), poet
 Charles Frederick Worth (1825-1895), fashion designer
 George Bower iron founder and inventor
 Edward King (1829-1910), Bishop of Lincoln
 Charlotte Alington Barnard (1830-1869), ballad composer and hymn writer
 Joseph Ruston (1835-1897), engineer and manufacturer
 George Green (Medal of Honor) (1840-1898), Medal of Honor recipient 
 Gonville Bromhead (1845-1891), Victoria Cross recipient
 Madge Kendal (1848-1935), actress

Born 1851-1950 

 Sarah Swift (1854-1937), Royal College of Nursing founder
 Frank Bramley (1857-1915), artist
 Adrian Woodruffe-Peacock (1858-1922), clergyman and ecologist
 William Robertson (1860-1933), Field Marshal
 Halford Mackinder (1861-1947), geographer
 Thomas Colclough Watson (1867-1917), Victoria Cross recipient
 Cyril Bland (1872-1950), cricketer
 William Tritton (1875-1946), tank developer
 Frank Pick (1878-1941), railway administrator
 Sybil Thorndike (1882-1976), actress
 Alfred Piccaver (1884-1958), tenor
 Arthur Lucan (1885-1954), part of the music hall act Old Mother Riley
 Charles Richard Sharpe (1889-1963), Victoria Cross recipient
 Harold Jackson (VC) (1892-1918), Victoria Cross recipient
 Ethel Rudkin (1893-1985), folklorist and archaeologist
 Sir Francis Hill (1899 –1980), historian and Mayor of Lincoln. Chancellor of Nottingham University. 
 Frank Whittle (1907-1996), RAF officer
 John George Haigh (1909-1949), serial killer
 Douglas Bader (1910-1982), RAF flying ace
 James Cobban (1910-1999), educator and headmaster
 Chad Varah (1911-2007), priest and "The Samaritans" founder
 Ted Savage (1912-1964), footballer
 Joseph Nickerson (1914-1990), entrepreneur
 Guy Gibson (1918-1944), bomber pilot and Victoria Cross recipient
 Liz Smith (1921-2016), actress
 Leslie Manser (1922-1942), bomber pilot and Victoria Cross recipient
 Brian Tierney (1922-2019), historian
 Nicholas Parsons (1923-2020), radio and TV presenter
 Neville Marriner (1924-2016), violinist and conductor
 Margaret Thatcher (1925-2013), former Prime Minister 
 Elizabeth Jennings (1926-2001), poet
 Brenda Fisher (1927–2022), swimmer
 Joan Plowright (born 1929), actress
 Jeff Hall (1929-1959), footballer
 Colin Dexter (1930-2017), crime writer
 Bill Podmore (1931-1994), television producer
 Neil McCarthy (1932-1985), actor
 Frank Sargeant (born 1932), retired Anglican bishop
 Mervyn Winfield (1932-2014), cricketer
 Bernard Codd (1934-2013), motorcycle road racer
 Victor Emery (1934-2002), physicist
 Mike Pinner (born 1934), football goalkeeper
 Bruce Barrymore Halpenny (born 1937), military historian and author
 Roy Axe (1937-2010), car designer
 Barry Spikings (born 1939), Hollywood producer
 John Alderton (born 1940), actor
 John Hurt (1940-2017), actor
 Jo Kendall (1940-2022), actress
 Ted Lewis (1940-1982), crime writer
 Graham Oates (born 1943), footballer
 John Hargreaves (born 1944), cricketer
 Tony Jacklin (born 1944), golfer
 Roger Scruton (1944–2020), philosopher
 Graham Taylor (1944-2017), footballer, club and England national team manager.
 Chris Wright (born 1944), music industry executive and businessman
 Patricia Hodge (born 1946), actress
 Iain Matthews (born 1946), singer-songwriter and musician
 Philip Priestley (born 1946), former British diplomat
 Richard Budge (1947-2016), coal mining entrepreneur
 Mick Atkin (1948-2008), football half-back
 Ray Clemence (born 1948), football goalkeeper
 Jim Broadbent (born 1949), actor
 Geoff Capes (born 1949), shotputter
 Rod Temperton (1949-2016), songwriter, record producer and musician
 Bernie Taupin (born 1950), songwriter.

Born 1951 onwards

 Brian Bolland (born 1951), comics artist
 John Ward (born 1951), footballer
 David Ward (born 1953), former Member of Parliament (MP)
 Michael Foale (born 1957), astronaut
 Jennifer Saunders (born 1958), actress and comedian 
 Chris Woods (born 1959), football goalkeeper
 Lee Chapman (born 1959), footballer
 Glenn Cockerill (born 1959), footballer
 Simon Garner (born 1959), footballer
 Alan Moulder (born 1959), record producer, mixing engineer and audio engineer
 John Cridland (born 1961), former Director-General of the Confederation of British Industry (CBI); Chair of Transport for the North (TfN)
 Bill Dunham (born 1961), former Deputy Commandant General of the Royal Marines
 Colin McFarlane (born 1961), actor
 Stephen Sackur (born 1964), broadcaster and journalist
 Jonathan Van-Tam (born 1964), specialist in influenza, and former Deputy Chief Medical Officer for England
 Helen Fospero (born 1966), newsreader and journalist 
 Antonio Berardi (born 1968), fashion designer
 Beverley Allitt (born 1968), serial killer
 Samantha Cameron (born 1971), businesswoman and wife of the former Prime Minister David Cameron
 Rae Earl (born 1971), author
 Jane Taylor (born 1972), singer and musician
 Robert Webb (born 1972), actor, comedian and writer
 Jonathan Kerrigan (born 1972), actor
 Paul Palmer (born 1974), swimmer
 Abi Titmuss (born 1976), poker player and glamour model
 Steve Housham (born 1976), footballer and manager
 Danny Butterfield (born 1979), footballer
 Colin Furze (born 1979), inventor and YouTube personality
 Kelly Adams (born 1979), actress
 Sheridan Smith (born 1981), actress
 Paul Mayo (born 1981), footballer
 Guy Martin (born 1981), motorcycle racer and television presenter
 Kevin Clifton (born 1982), professional dancer and actor
 Joanne Clifton (born 1983), professional dancer and actress
 Lloyd Griffith (born 1983), comedian, actor, presenter and singer
 Carl Hudson (born 1983), musician
 Ross Edgley (born 1985), extreme adventurer, ultra-marathon sea swimmer and author
 Nicola Roberts (born 1985), singer
 Oliver Ryan (born 1985), footballer
 Luke Wright (born 1985), cricketer
 Lee Frecklington (born 1985), footballer
 Kate Haywood (born 1987), swimmer
 Sam Clucas (born 1990), footballer
 Georgie Twigg (born 1990), hockey player
 Sophie Wells (born 1990), para-equestrian
 Scott Williams (born 1990), darts player
 Thomas Turgoose (born 1992), actor
 Eliza Butterworth (born 1993), actress
 Patrick Bamford (born 1993), footballer
 Jack Harvey (born 1993), racing driver
 Hollie Arnold (born 1994), javelin thrower  
 Ella Henderson (born 1996), singer and songwriter
 Holly Humberstone (born 1999), singer and songwriter
 Ellis Chapman (born 2001), footballer
 Ollie Chessum (Born 2000), rugby player
 Will Wand (born 2001), rugby player

Lists of English people by location
Lists of people by county in the United Kingdom